The 210th (Frontiersmen) Battalion, CEF was a unit in the Canadian Expeditionary Force during the First World War.  Based in Moose Jaw, Saskatchewan, the unit was raised by the local Legion of Frontiersmen in early 1916 in that city and surrounding district.  After sailing to England in April 1917, the battalion was absorbed into the 19th Reserve Battalion on April 22, 1917.  The 210th (Frontiersmen) Battalion, CEF had one Commanding Officer: Lieut-Col. W. E. Seaborn. The Battalion was awarded the Battle Honour "Honour of the Great War".

References
Meek, John F. Over the Top! The Canadian Infantry in the First World War. Orangeville, Ont.: The Author, 1971.

External links
 Frontiersmen Are Recruiting in City Now / Lethbridge Herald / 11 May 1916

Battalions of the Canadian Expeditionary Force
Moose Jaw